Iñaki Aguilar Vicente (born 9 September 1983) is a Spanish water polo player who competed in the 2008 Summer Olympics, 2012 Summer Olympics.2012 Summer Olympics. and 2016 Summer Olympics.

See also
 Spain men's Olympic water polo team records and statistics
 List of men's Olympic water polo tournament goalkeepers
 List of World Aquatics Championships medalists in water polo

References

External links

 
  

1983 births
Living people
Spanish male water polo players
Water polo goalkeepers
Olympic water polo players of Spain
Water polo players at the 2008 Summer Olympics
Water polo players at the 2016 Summer Olympics
Water polo players at the 2012 Summer Olympics
World Aquatics Championships medalists in water polo
Mediterranean Games silver medalists for Spain
Mediterranean Games medalists in water polo
Competitors at the 2013 Mediterranean Games
21st-century Spanish people